Autosticha is a genus of gelechioid moths. It belongs to the subfamily Autostichinae, which is either placed in the concealer moth family (Oecophoridae), or in an expanded Autostichidae. It is the type genus of its subfamily (and the Autostichidae). Originally, this genus was named Automola, but this name properly refers to a fly genus in family Richardiidae.

Typically, these moths have the second and third forewing vein emerging from a common stalk. The labial palps are characteristically tapering from the second segment onwards and end in a pointed tip.

Several originally independent genera are now included here, and while most of them are probably not even valid as subgenera, some species included in Autosticha have been historically assigned to entirely different Gelechioidea lineages, such as the long-horned moths (Lecithoceridae) or the Xyloryctidae.

Species
Species of Autosticha are:

 Autosticha academica Meyrick, 1922
 Autosticha acharacta Meyrick, 1918
 Autosticha affixella (Walker, 1864)
 Autosticha ansata Meyrick, 1931
 Autosticha aspasta Meyrick, 1908
 Autosticha arcivalvaris S.X.Wang, 2004
 Autosticha aureolata Meyrick, 1908
 Autosticha authaema (Meyrick, 1906)
 Autosticha auxodelta Meyrick, 1916
 Autosticha bacilliformis S.X.Wang, 2004
 Autosticha banauscopa (Meyrick, 1929)
 Autosticha bilobella Park & Wu, 2003
 Autosticha binaria Meyrick, 1908
 Autosticha calceata Meyrick, 1908
 Autosticha chernetis (Meyrick, 1906)
 Autosticha chishuiensis S.X.Wang, 2004
 Autosticha chlorodelta (Meyrick, 1906)
 Autosticha cipingensis S.X.Wang, 2004
 Autosticha complexivalvula S.X.Wang, 2004
 Autosticha conciliata Meyrick, 1918
 Autosticha conjugipunctata S.X.Wang, 2004
 Autosticha consimilis Park & Wu, 2003
 Autosticha crocothicta Meyrick, 1916
 Autosticha cuspidata Park & Wu, 2003
 Autosticha dayuensis Park & Wu, 2003
 Autosticha deductella (Walker, 1864)
 Autosticha demetrias Meyrick, 1908
 Autosticha demias Meyrick, 1886
 Autosticha demotica Meyrick, 1908
 Autosticha dianeura Meyrick, 1939
 Autosticha dimochla Meyrick, 1935
 Autosticha emmetra Meyrick, 1921
 Autosticha encycota Meyrick, 1922
 Autosticha enervata Meyrick, 1929
 Autosticha euryterma Meyrick, 1920
 Autosticha exemplaris Meyrick, 1916
 Autosticha fallaciosa S.X.Wang, 2004
 Autosticha flavescens Meyrick, 1916
 Autosticha flavida S.X.Wang, 2004
 Autosticha guangdongensis Park & Wu, 2003
 Autosticha guttulata Meyrick, 1925
 Autosticha hainanica Park & Wu, 2003
 Autosticha heteromalla S.X.Wang, 2004
 Autosticha imitativa Ueda, 1997
 Autosticha iterata Meyrick, 1916
 Autosticha kyotensis (Matsumura, 1931)
 Autosticha latiuncusa Park & Wu, 2003
 Autosticha leucoptera J. F. G. Clarke, 1986
 Autosticha leukosa Park & Wu, 2003
 Autosticha lushanensis Park & Wu, 2003
 Autosticha maculosa S.X.Wang, 2004
 Autosticha menglunica S.X.Wang, 2004
 Autosticha merista Clarke, 1971
 Autosticha microphilodema S.X.Wang, 2004
 Autosticha mingchrica Park & Wu, 2003
 Autosticha mirabilis S.X.Wang, 2004
 Autosticha modicella (Christoph, 1882)
 Autosticha nanchangensis S.X.Wang, 2004
 Autosticha naulychna Meyrick, 1908
 Autosticha nothriforme (Walsingham, 1897)
 Autosticha nothropis Meyrick, 1921
 Autosticha oxyacantha S.X.Wang, 2004
 Autosticha pachysticta (Meyrick, 1936)
 Autosticha pelaea Meyrick, 1908
 Autosticha pelodes (Meyrick, 1883) – autosticha gelechid moth
 Autosticha pentagona Park & Wu, 2003
 Autosticha perixantha Meyrick, 1914
 Autosticha petrotoma Meyrick, 1916
 Autosticha phaulodes Meyrick, 1908
 Autosticha protypa Meyrick, 1908
 Autosticha pyungyangenis Park & Wu, 2003
 Autosticha rectipunctata S.X.Wang, 2004
 Autosticha relaxata Meyrick, 1916
 Autosticha shenae S.X.Wang, 2004
 Autosticha shexianica S.X.Wang, 2004
 Autosticha siccivora Meyrick, 1935
 Autosticha sichunica Park & Wu, 2003
 Autosticha silacea Bradley, 1962
 Autosticha sinica Park & Wu, 2003
 Autosticha solita Meyrick, 1923
 Autosticha solomonensis Bradley, 1957
 Autosticha spilochorda Meyrick, 1916
 Autosticha squarrosa S.X.Wang, 2004
 Autosticha stagmatopis Meyrick, 1923
 Autosticha strenuella (Walker, 1864)
 Autosticha suwonensis Park & Wu, 2003
 Autosticha symmetra (Turner, 1919)
 Autosticha taiwana Park & Wu, 2003
 Autosticha tetrapeda Meyrick, 1908
 Autosticha tetragonopa (Meyrick, 1935)
 Autosticha thermopis Meyrick, 1923
 Autosticha tianmushana S.X.Wang, 2004
 Autosticha triangulimaculella (Caradja, 1928)
 Autosticha truncicola Ueda, 1997
 Autosticha valvidentata S.X.Wang, 2004
 Autosticha valvifida S.X.Wang, 2004
 Autosticha vicularis Meyrick, 1911
 Autosticha wufengensis S.X.Wang, 2004
 Autosticha xanthographa Meyrick, 1916

Some of these might belong in other genera of Autostichinae, such as the supposedly monotypic Stoeberhinus.

Former species
 Autosticha opaca (Meyrick, 1931)
 Autosticha philodema (Meyrick, 1938)

Footnotes

References
 Australian Biological Resources Study (2008). Australian Faunal Directory – "Autosticha". Version of 9 October 2008. Retrieved 17 October 2011.
 Clarke, John Frederick Gates (1986). "Pyralidae and Microlepidoptera of the Marquesas Archipelago". Smithsonian Contributions to Zoology 416: 1–485.
 
 
 
 Park, K. T. & Wu, C. S. (2003). "A revision of the genus Autosticha Meyrick (Lepidoptera: Oecophoridae) in eastern Asia". Insecta Koreana. 20 (2): 195–225.
 Ueda, T. (1997). "A Revision of the Genus Autosticha Meyrick from Japan (Lepidoptera, Oecophoridae)". Japanese Journal of Entomology. 65 (1): 108–126.
 Wang, S.-X. (2004). "A systematic study of Autosticha Meyrick from China, with descriptions of Twenty-Three new species (Lepidoptera: Autostichidae)". Acta Zootaxonomica Sinica. 29 (1): 38–62.

 
Autostichinae
Moth genera